Lest We Forget may refer to:

 "Lest we forget", a phrase in the poem "Recessional" by Rudyard Kipling
 "Ode of Remembrance", United Kingdom, Canada, Australia, and New Zealand

Film
 Lest We Forget (1918 film), a 1918 film by Léonce Perret
 Lest We Forget (1934 film), a British film directed by John Baxter
 Lest We Forget (1935 film), a 100-minute official government documentary on the First World War produced by the Canadian Government Motion Picture Bureau
 Lest We Forget (1937 film), starring Harry Carey 
 Lest We Forget (1947 film), a 1947 military documentary produced by the U.S. army and signal corps
 Lest We Forget (1991 film), a 1991 film by Jean-Luc Godard

Literature
 "Lest We Forget", a science fiction short story by David Barr Kirtley and 1997 Dell Magazines Award winner
 Lest We Forget: The Passage from Africa to Slavery and Emancipation, Alex award-winning book by Velma Maia Thomas

Music
 Lest We Forget: The Best Of, 2004 album by Marilyn Manson
 "Lest We Forget", a song by Bolt Thrower from the 1994 album ...For Victory
 "Lest We Forget", a song by The Real McKenzies from the 2003 album Oot & Aboot
 "Lest We Forget", a song by Ron Dawson and Kevin Morgan 2012 from the album Ron Dawson